Callipielus is a genus of moths of the family Hepialidae. There are 10 described species, all found in southern South America.

Species 

Callipielus arenosus - Chile/Argentina
Callipielus argentata - Chile
Callipielus digitata - Chile
Callipielus fumosa - Chile
Callipielus gentillii - Argentina
Callipielus izquierdoi - Chile
Callipielus krahmeri - Chile
Callipielus perforata - Argentina
Callipielus salasi - Chile
Callipielus vulgaris - Argentina

External links
Hepialidae genera

Hepialidae
Exoporia genera
Taxa named by Arthur Gardiner Butler